The Pine Bluff Confederate Monument has long been located in front of the Jefferson County courthouse, at Barraque and Main Streets in Pine Bluff, Arkansas. It depicts a standing Confederate Army soldier, holding a rifle whose butt rests on the ground. It was placed in 1910 by the local chapter of the United Daughters of the Confederacy.

The monument was listed on the National Register of Historic Places in 1996. On June 20, 2020, the monument was removed from the Jefferson County courthouse as part of a cooperative agreement between County Judge Gerald Robinson and the United Daughters of the Confederacy. The statue was then moved to an undisclosed location for storage where it can be cleaned and repaired.

See also
List of monuments and memorials removed during the George Floyd protests
National Register of Historic Places listings in Jefferson County, Arkansas

References

1910 sculptures
Monuments and memorials in the United States removed during the George Floyd protests
Buildings and structures in Jefferson County, Arkansas
Former National Register of Historic Places in Arkansas
Monuments and memorials on the National Register of Historic Places in Arkansas
National Register of Historic Places in Jefferson County, Arkansas
Neoclassical architecture in Arkansas
Tourist attractions in Jefferson County, Arkansas
United Daughters of the Confederacy monuments and memorials in Arkansas
1910 establishments in Arkansas
Statues removed in 2020